Émile Colonne  (18 April 1885 – 13 May 1970) was a French baritone, a member of the troupe of the Théâtre de la Monnaie in Brussels.

Biography 
Émile Aimable Parfait Colonne was born in Toulon on 18 April 11885 in a modest family. His father was a carpenter and nothing predestined the young apprentice plumber who liked to sing in a lyrical career. A lung disease caused him to take singing lessons as therapeutic breathing exercises. His natural dispositions led him to the conservatory of Toulon and then to the Marseille conservatory where he obtained a First Prize.

On 7 June 1913, he married a young pianist in Toulon: Marie-Louise Bonduel (Toulon, 22 August 1886 - Brussels, 30 November 1970), whose family was linked to personalities such as Claude Debussy, Xavier Leroux and Camille Saint-Saëns. He made his debut on the stage of the Opéra de Toulon. His voice of baritone of opéra comique and his physical appearance as a "young premier" made him noticeable by opera directors who called him on stages all over the country and beyond: Toulouse, Nancy, Strasbourg, Geneva, Algiers, Marseille, Tunis, Nantes.

In 1924 he was hired by Maurice Corneil de Thoran in the troupe of the Théâtre de la Monnaie in Brussels where his career continued until 1952, interspersed with recitals, concerts and roles in other Opera houses such as the Opéra Garnier where he sang Papageno in 1928.

Émile Colonne died 13 May 1970 in Brussels.

Repertoire 
Émile Colonne's repertoire consists of 67 roles, including 23 premieres for the Théâtre de la Monnaie, and notably: 
Opera
 Boniface: Le Jongleur de Notre-Dame by Jules Massenet
 Créon: Antigone by Arthur Honegger
 Des Grieux: Manon by Jules Massenet
 Don Giovanni: Don Giovanni by Mozart
 Germont: La traviata by Giuseppe Verdi
 Ourrias: Mireille by Charles Gounod
 Pandolphe: Cendrillon by Jules Massenet
 Sancho: Don Quichotte by Jules Massenet
 Il barbiere di Siviglia by Gioachino Rossini
 Grisélidis by Jules Massenet
 Roméo et Juliette by Charles Gounod
Recital
 Don Quichotte à Dulcinée by Maurice Ravel
 La Légende du preux by 
 The dream by Franz Schubert
 O Holy Night by Adolphe Adam

References

External links 
 Émile Colonne (1885-1970) baryton français on Ader Nordman

1885 births
1970 deaths
Musicians from Toulon
French operatic baritones
20th-century French male opera singers